Food Force 2 is an educational game developed with an aim to defy the pedantic system followed in many countries and to help children explore the community, learn importance of food nutrition.  It is a sequel to Food Force, a game developed by the United Nations World Food Programme. Food Force 2 is free software released under the GNU GPL.

Game play 

The game currently has a storyboard, which is developed from a viewpoint of an Indian villager, who is the Sarpanch (The administrator of the ruling body, Panchayat, of the village) of a village and his son helps him in the development of the village, who is the next candidate for the position currently held by his father. The story has 9 missions for the player. All of them deal with the different aspects of the management of a village.

The key learning areas on which the game focuses are:

 Strategy for developing the village.
 Sustainable development of the resources present in the village
 Technology and its use
 Collaboration to solve community problems
 Crisis Management

Availability

Food Force 2, has been developed as free software under the terms of version 3 of the GNU General Public License. It is cross-platform as it is written in the Python programming language, and runs on platforms including the One Laptop Per Child XO and the Sugar desktop environment. Food Force 2 is available for download on Linux, Windows and Mac OS X platforms.

See also
 Food Force

External links
https://code.google.com/p/foodforce/
 A blog about the game's development

Humanitarian video games
Advergames
Windows games
Educational video games
Linux games
MacOS games
Free educational software
Open-source video games
Video games about food and drink
Video games set in India